Walvis Bay Rural constituency is a constituency in the Erongo Region of Namibia. It comprises the rural area surrounding the constituency's district capital city of Walvis Bay, and additionally some streets on the outskirts of the city. It had a population of 26,916 in 2011, up from 16,293 in 2001.  the constituency had 25,746 registered voters.

Inhabitants
Walvis Bay Rural constituency includes a string of settlements by the ǂAonin (Southern Topnaar) community, a subtribe of the Nama people. These settlements are situated along the Kuiseb River and include Utuseb and Rooibank.

Politics
In the 2010 regional elections, SWAPO's Johannes Nangolo won the constituency with 3,804 votes. His closest challenger was Tjitekuru Joseph of the Rally for Democracy and Progress, who received 646 votes. Nangolo also won the 2015 regional elections with 3,928 votes. Runner-up and only challenger was Joan Valencia Izaaks of the Democratic Turnhalle Alliance (DTA) who received 801 votes.

The 2020 regional election was won by Florian Tegako Donatus of the Independent Patriots for Change (IPC, an opposition party formed in August 2020). He obtained 3,433 votes. The SWAPO candidate, Hilma Tonata Shikongo, came second with 2,318 votes, and Ambrosius Swartbooi of the Landless People's Movement (LPM, an opposition party formed in 2016) came in third with 904 votes.

References

Constituencies of Erongo Region
Walvis Bay
States and territories established in 1992
1992 establishments in Namibia